Havelka (feminine Havelková) is a Czech surname. Notable people with the surname include:

 Filip Havelka, Czech footballer
 František Havelka, Czech boxer
 Helena Havelková, Czech volleyball player
 Libuše Havelková, Czech actress
 Ondřej Havelka, Czech swing singer
 Pavel Havelka, Czech canoeist
 Roman Havelka, Czech painter
 Svatopluk Havelka, Czech composer
 Vladimíra Havelková, Czech canoer

See also
Hawełka

Czech-language surnames